Jan Erazim Vocel (23 August 1803 – 16 September 1871) was a Czech poet, archaeologist, historian and cultural revivalist. Though as heir to his father's trade he was to become a baker, his parents, observing his youthful enthusiasm for Gothic history, eventually heeded his academic calling.

Early life
Vocel was born in Kutná Hora. At 14 he moved to Prague to attend a Piarist college-preparatory high school. Concomitantly he attended philosophy lectures at Charles University. Already by that time he had begun writing fiction, of which efforts only two complete works survive—Krvočíše (Bloodshot), a romance about growing grapes in celebration of Charles IV (King of Bohemia and Holy Roman Emperor), and Harp (1875), a tragedy. On graduating, Vocel departed from Prague to Vienna, where he studied philosophy and law. In order to support himself and assist his family, Vocel accepted tutoring appointments in various homes of the ancient Bohemian Czernin family and later of other noble families, e.g., the House of Harrach, where he established himself as an abiding mentor to nascent businessman / arts patron Jan Harrach (1828–1909).

On graduating from the University of Vienna, Vocel returned to Prague, where, in 1843, he helped to establish the Archaeological Society.

Literature

Vocel's literary work reflects a pathological interest in medieval history, archeology and historiography. By and large his two most significant works are thought to be Poslední Orebit and Přemyslovci.

In 1850 Vocel was appointed Associate Professor of Archeology and Art History at the Charles University. As author of numerous articles and scientific papers he inadvertently introduced what would later become a widely accepted method of chemical analysis to determine the age of bronze objects.

A highlight of his literary career was the two-volume Prehistory of the Czech Lands (1866, '68), in which he posited a sound foundation for archeology in Czech science. Though beyond its expanded description of his method of chemical analysis the work did not offer archeological breakthroughs or newer methods, it has exercised considerable influence abroad.

Together with Czech writer, historian, museum director, patriot and publicist Karel Vladislav Zap (1812–1871), Vocel contributed to the popularity and development of Czech archeology through their 1854 co-founding of a specialized organ, "Archaeological Monuments" (edited by Zap from 1854 to '66), in which Czech history, from its mythic beginnings to the Hussite movement, was examined and celebrated.

In 1872 the bourgeois Czech writer Jakub Malý, an early devotee of Czech history and literature and promoter of the study of the English language, published the biography Jan Erazim Vocel.

Science
Vocel inadvertently pioneered a chemical method of determining the age of bronze objects. He published numerous scientific and historical-fiction books including his two-part treatise Prehistory of the Czech Lands, which laid a foundation for scientific archeology in the country.

Legacy
Vocel died in Prague. Alongside fellow Kutná Hora natives Karel Havlíček Borovský and Josef Kajetán Tyl, he is regarded as a key figure in the 19th century Czech national revival.

References

External links

 Petřík, M., "Jan Erazim Vocel", episode 65 of Dvaasedmdesát jmen české historie (Seventy-two names in Czech history), Česká televize, 2010, 13 min. (in Czech)
 Vélová, L., Entry on Vocel, Archeologie na dosah, National Museum. (in Czech)
 Vocel, J. E., Grundzüge der böhmischen Alterthumskunde (Prague: Kronberger und Řiwnač, 1845). (in German)

1803 births
People from Kutná Hora
University of Vienna alumni
Charles University alumni
Czech archaeologists
Museologists
Prehistorians
Czech art historians
19th-century Czech historians
19th-century Czech poets
Czech male poets
1871 deaths
Burials at Olšany Cemetery